The 1944 United States Senate special election in Colorado took place on November 7, 1944. Incumbent Republican Senator Eugene Millikin, who was first appointed to fill Alva B. Adams's seat in 1941 and re-elected at the ensuing special election in 1942, ran for re-election to his first full term. In the general election, he faced wealthy Denver attorney Barney L. Whatley. Millikin benefited from the strong Republican performance in Colorado—Thomas E. Dewey and Governor John C. Vivian both won their respective elections by decisive margins—and cruised to a landslide victory over Whatley.

Democratic primary

Candidates
 Barney L. Whatley, Denver attorney, former Chairman of the Colorado Democratic Party, former District Attorney for the Fifth Judicial District

Campaign
Though Colorado remained competitive for both parties in state and national politics, the state Democratic Party had few candidates interested in running against Senator Millikin. Though the party had attempted to recruit James G. Patton, the President of the National Farmers Union, to run, he declined to do so. Barney L. Whatley, a prominent Denver attorney who served as District Attorney for the Fifth Judicial Circuit from 1913 to 1921 and more recently as chairman of the state party, initially declined to run, but ultimately accepted the nomination, saying that someone "must carry the issue of this campaign to the crossroads of the state."

Results

Republican primary

Candidates
 Eugene Millikin, incumbent U.S. Senator

Results

General election

Results

References

1944
Colorado
United States Senate